Who's the Enemy is an extended play and the first studio release overall by the British crust punk band Amebix. It was released on Spiderleg Records on 28 August 1982.

The EP was re-released as part of the compilation No Sanctuary: The Spiderleg Recordings in 2008 on Alternative Tentacles.

Track listing

Personnel
Amebix
 The Baron Rockin von Aphid (Rob Miller) — vocals, bass
 Stig Da Pig (Chris Miller) — guitar
 Virus (Neil Worthington) — drums
 Norman — keyboards

References

1982 debut EPs
Amebix albums